Samuel Riley was a state legislator in Mississippi. He represented Wilkinson County, Mississippi in the Mississippi House of Representatives from 1876 to 1878. He served with fellow Wilkinson County representative J. W. Shattuck.

References

Year of birth missing (living people)
Living people
People from Wilkinson County, Mississippi
African-American state legislators in Mississippi
Members of the Mississippi House of Representatives
African-American men in politics
19th-century African-American politicians
19th-century American politicians